Financial regulation is a form of regulation or supervision, which subjects financial institutions to certain requirements, restrictions and guidelines, aiming to maintain the stability and integrity of the financial system. This may be handled by either a government or non-government organization. Financial regulation has also influenced the structure of banking sectors by increasing the variety of financial products available. Financial regulation forms one of three legal categories which constitutes the content of financial law, the other two being market practices and case law.

History

In the early modern period, the Dutch were the pioneers in financial regulation. The first recorded ban (regulation) on short selling was enacted by the Dutch authorities as early as 1610.

Aims of regulation
The objectives of financial regulators are usually:
 market confidence – to maintain confidence in the financial system
 financial stability – contributing to the protection and enhancement of stability of the financial system
 consumer protection – securing the appropriate degree of protection for consumers.

Structure of supervision
Acts empower organizations, government or non-government, to monitor activities and enforce actions. There are various setups and combinations in place for the financial regulatory structure around the globe.

Supervision of stock exchanges

Exchange acts ensure that trading on the exchanges is conducted in a proper manner. Most prominent the pricing process, execution and settlement of  trades, direct and efficient trade monitoring.

Supervision of listed companies
Financial regulators ensure that listed companies and market participants comply with various regulations under the trading acts. The trading acts demands that listed companies publish regular financial reports, ad hoc notifications or directors' dealings. Whereas market participants are required to publish major shareholder notifications. The objective of monitoring compliance by listed companies with their disclosure requirements is to ensure that investors have access to essential and adequate information for making an informed assessment of listed companies and their securities.

Supervision of investment management
Asset management supervision or investment acts ensures the frictionless operation of those vehicles.

Supervision of banks and financial services providers

Banking acts lay down rules for banks which they have to observe when they are being established and when they are carrying on their business. These rules are designed to prevent unwelcome developments that might disrupt the smooth functioning of the banking system. Thus ensuring a strong and efficient banking system.

Authority by country

The following is a short listing of regulatory authorities in various jurisdictions, for a more complete listing, please see list of financial regulatory authorities by country.
 United States and its territories
U.S. Securities and Exchange Commission (SEC)
 Financial Industry Regulatory Authority (FINRA)
 Consumer Financial Protection Bureau (CFPB)
 Commodity Futures Trading Commission (CFTC)
 Federal Reserve System ("Fed")
 Federal Deposit Insurance Corporation (FDIC)
 Office of the Comptroller of the Currency (OCC)
 National Association of Insurance Commissioners (NAIC) (a State-based regulatory standards organization, the McCarran–Ferguson Act exempts the "business of insurance" from most regulation at the Federal level)
 National Credit Union Administration (NCUA)
 United Kingdom
 Bank of England (BoE)
 Prudential Regulation Authority (PRA)
 Financial Conduct Authority (FCA)
 Financial Services Agency (FSA), Japan
 Federal Financial Supervisory Authority (BaFin), Germany
 Autorité des marchés financiers (France) (AMF), France
 Monetary Authority of Singapore (MAS), Singapore
 Hong Kong Monetary Authority (HKMA), Hong Kong
 Swiss Financial Market Supervisory Authority (FINMA), Switzerland
 People's Republic of China
 China Banking Regulatory Commission (CBRC)
 China Insurance Regulatory Commission (CIRC)
 China Securities Regulatory Commission (CSRC)
 India:
 Reserve Bank of India (RBI)
 Securities and Exchange Board of India (SEBI)
 Insolvency and Bankruptcy Board of India (IBBI)
 Insurance Regulatory and Development Authority of India (IRDAI) 
 Pension Fund Regulatory and Development Authority (PFRDA)

Unique jurisdictions 
In most cases, financial regulatory authorities regulate all financial activities. But in some cases, there are specific authorities to regulate each sector of the finance industry, mainly banking, securities, insurance and pensions markets, but in some cases also commodities, futures, forwards, etc. For example, in Australia, the Australian Prudential Regulation Authority (APRA) supervises banks and insurers, while the Australian Securities and Investments Commission (ASIC) is responsible for enforcing financial services and corporations laws.

Sometimes more than one institution regulates and supervises the banking market, normally because, apart from regulatory authorities, central banks also regulate the banking industry. For example, in the USA banking is regulated by a lot of regulators, such as the Federal Reserve System, the Federal Deposit Insurance Corporation, the Office of the Comptroller of the Currency, the National Credit Union Administration, as well as regulators at the state level.

In the European Union, the European System of Financial Supervision consists of the European Banking Authority (EBA), the European Securities and Markets Authority (ESMA) and the European Insurance and Occupational Pensions Authority (EIOPA) as well as the European Systemic Risk Board. The Eurozone countries are forming a Single Supervisory Mechanism under the European Central Bank as a prelude to Banking union.

There are also associations of financial regulatory authorities. At the international level, there is the International Organization of Securities Commissions (IOSCO), the International Association of Insurance Supervisors, the Basel Committee on Banking Supervision, the Joint Forum, and the Financial Stability Board, where national authorities set standards through consensus-based decision-making processes.

The structure of financial regulation has changed significantly in the past two decades, as the legal and geographic boundaries between markets in banking, securities, and insurance have become increasingly "blurred" and globalized.

Regulatory reliance on credit rating agencies
Think-tanks such as the World Pensions Council (WPC) have argued that most European governments pushed dogmatically for the adoption of the Basel II recommendations, adopted in 2005, transposed in European Union law through the Capital Requirements Directive (CRD), effective since 2008. In essence, they forced European banks, and, more importantly, the European Central Bank itself e.g. when gauging the solvency of EU-based financial institutions, to rely more than ever on the standardized assessments of credit risk marketed by two private US agencies- Moody's and S&P, thus using public policy and ultimately taxpayers’ money to strengthen an anti-competitive duopolistic industry.

See also

 Bank regulation
 Finance
 
 Financial ethics
 Financial repression
 Global financial system
 Group of Thirty
 Insurance law
 International Organization of Securities Commissions
 International Centre for Financial Regulation
 LabEx ReFi - European Laboratory on Financial Regulation
 Macroprudential regulation
 Microprudential regulation
 Regulatory capture
 Regulatory economics
 Securities commission
 
 Virtual currency law in the United States

References

Further reading 
 Labonte, Marc. (2017). Who Regulates Whom? An Overview of the U.S. Financial Regulatory Framework. Washington, D.C.: Congressional Research Service.
 
 Simpson, D., Meeks, G., Klumpes, P., & Andrews, P. (2000). Some cost-benefit issues in financial regulation. London: Financial Services Authority.

External links
 Securities Lawyer's Deskbook from the University of Cincinnati College of Law
 Ana Carvajal, Jennifer Elliott: IMF Study Points to Gaps in Securities Market Regulation
 IOSCO: Objectives and Principles of Securities Regulation (PDF-Datei 67 Seiten)

 
Financial law